Sabuj Kanan High School & College is a secondary school in Sirajganj town, Sirajganj Sadar Upazila, Sirajganj District, Bangladesh.

History
The school was established in 1980 with the help of former Deputy Commissioner Md. Azizul Haque Vuiyan, local residents, government assistance, and non-governmental people. The school was initially named Rashedajjoha Girls College but later called Sabuj Kanan High School. After some time at Mujib Sarak Road, the school gained its own shelter and started classes with eight tin-shed classrooms.

Initially the school taught from play group to class five. In 1987 it had only 148 students. By 2011 the school boasted over 3500 students. In 1993 they opened class six and then to class eight. In 1995, the school was changed into secondary.

A five-storied building was constructed which contained 49 classrooms. The ground floor and the first floor were made with the help of Saiyad Abdur Rouf Mukta. In 2004, with the help of former Deputy Commissioner Aminul Bar Chowdhury and the other members of the managing committee, the second floor was built.

In 2000, the play group through class two was run in a morning shift while classes three through ten were run during a day shift. In 2002, the girls were changed to the morning shift and the boys were placed in the day shift.

Achievements

Activities
In 2002 the school established a drama team who play 6-10 dramas a year.

In 2001 the school prepared a scout-den. In 2004, when the 7th National and 4th SAARC Jamboree started, they ran a scout jamboree competition at Gazipur, in Dhaka. Sabuj Kanan school gained the best place in the country. In national day of the country students performed in District Stadium and won 1st prize for several times. Debate club of this school contributed much in last few years.

References

Sources
 

High schools in Bangladesh
1980 establishments in Bangladesh
Sirajganj Sadar Upazila
Education in Sirajgonj